Professor Laura McAllister  (born 10 December 1964) is a Welsh academic, former international footballer and senior sports administrator. As a Wales women's national football team player, McAllister won 24 caps and served as team captain. She is currently Professor of Public Policy and the Governance of Wales at the Wales Governance Centre at Cardiff University. She was formerly Professor of Governance at Liverpool University. She was appointed Commander of the Order of the British Empire (CBE) in the 2016 Birthday Honours for services to sport. She was a board member of Stonewall from 2012 to 2015, and is currently a board member of the Institute of Welsh Affairs. She is Chair of the Welsh Sports Hall of Fame and a Non-executive Director of Goodson Thomas boutique executive search agency. She was honoured as one of the BBC 100 Women in December 2022.

Academic career
McAllister is a former pupil of Ysgol Glyndwr and Bryntirion Comprehensive School in Bridgend. She is a graduate of the London School of Economics, where she completed a BSc. (Econ.) Honours degree in Government, and at Cardiff University, where she completed a PhD in Politics. She was Professor of Governance at the University of Liverpool Management School between 1998 and October 2016. She is now Professor of Governance and Public Policy at Cardiff University's Wales Governance Centre. She is a member of the Learned Society of Wales and a Fellow of the Royal Society of the Arts.

She was a member of the National Assembly for Wales Remuneration Board from 2014 to 2015, an advisor to the Independent Panel on Assembly Members' Pay and Support from 2008 to 2009, and a member of the Richard Commission between 2002 and 2004. She advised the Independent Panel on AMs' Pay and Support, 2008–10 and was Chair of the Expert Panel on Assembly Electoral Reform which published its report "A Parliament that Works for Wales" in December 2017. In October 2021, she was named co-chair of the Independent Constitutional Commission on Wales' place in the United Kingdom. 

She holds honorary degrees and fellowships from Bangor University, Cardiff University, Cardiff Metropolitan University, Swansea University, and Trinity St David's University.

Club career
McAllister was a club athlete (middle distance) and played netball and hockey. She did not play organised football until she joined Millwall Lionesses while studying at the London School of Economics. Upon her return to Wales, she spent 12 years with Cardiff City. McAllister was Club Captain and collected two Welsh Women's Cup winner's medals and won promotion into the FA Women's Premier League with Cardiff City. She is one of the club's Vice Presidents.

International career
In 1992, McAllister was one of three female footballers who lobbied Football Association of Wales (FAW) secretary Alun Evans to grant recognition to women's football in Wales. An official team was put together and entered the 1995 UEFA Women's Championship qualification tournament. McAllister made her debut in Wales' second match, a 12–0 defeat by eventual winners Germany in Bielefeld. She won a total of 24 caps for Wales and was team captain on many occasions.

Sports governance
Professor McAllister was Chair of Sport Wales between 2010 and March 2016. In this role, she oversaw the most successful period ever for elite sport in Wales, with Wales winning a record number of medals in the Commonwealth Games 2014, the 2012 London Olympics and Paralympics and the 2016 Rio Olympics and Paralympics. She was also a board member of UK Sport between 2010 and 2016, when Team GB broke its medal-winning records. She is currently a Director of the Football Association of Wales Trust. McAllister was nominated by the Football Association of Wales for election as UEFA's female member of the FIFA Council but was controversially prevented from standing. She is currently Deputy Chair of the UEFA Women's Football Committee (2017–) and Chair of the Welsh Sports Hall of Fame. McAllister is contesting the election for the female representative from UEFA on FIFA Council (April 2021).

Politics and media
McAllister was a Plaid Cymru Parliamentary candidate in 1987 and 1992 but left the party shortly afterwards. She is currently a political commentator for the BBC and other media platforms. She commentates regularly on international, network and Welsh media on Welsh politics, elections and public policy. McAllister writes a regular column on current affairs, sport and politics in the Western Mail newspaper and for Wales Online.

On 10 February 2022, McAllister was a panellist for BBC's Question Time. McAllister was the only Welsh woman to be included in the BBC's 100 Women List 2022, alongside Priyanka Chopra Jonas, Geraldina Guerra Garcés, Selma Blair and 96 others.

Visit to Qatar
While following Wales to the 2022 FIFA World Cup, McAllister was prevented from entering the stadium ahead of the opening game with a bucket hat which had a rainbow on it. FIFA officials told her that the hat was a "restricted item" and attempted to confiscate it from her. The attempts to separate McAllister from her bucket hat seemed to relate to a crackdown in Qatar on items that had a rainbow on them and affected numerous other fans, including U.S. former Sports Illustrated journalist Grant Wahl, who was arrested over a t-shirt, as well as a reporter for The New York Times who attempted to report on that incident only to become caught up in the crackdown himself.

Private life 
McAllister and her partner Llinos Jones have two children.

References

External links
 
 Meeting Laura McAllister – the most influential woman in Welsh sport at nation.cymru, published 23 December 2021

Living people
Welsh women's footballers
Wales women's international footballers
Cardiff City Ladies F.C. players
FA Women's National League players
Millwall Lionesses L.F.C. players
1964 births
Footballers from Bridgend
Welsh nationalists
Alumni of the London School of Economics
Academics of the University of Liverpool
Plaid Cymru politicians
Commanders of the Order of the British Empire
Women's association football defenders
LGBT academics
British LGBT sportspeople
BBC 100 Women
Welsh women academics